The Ahmadpur–Katwa line is a railway branch line connecting Ahmadpur Junction railway station in Birbhum district and Katwa in Purba Bardhaman district of the Indian state of West Bengal. It is under the jurisdiction of the Eastern Railway.

History

McLeod's Light Railways
McLeod's Light Railways (MLR) consisted of four  narrow-gauge lines in West Bengal. The railways were built and owned by McLeod & Company, a subsidiary of a London company of managing agents, McLeod Russell & Co. Ltd.

Ahmedpur–Katwa Railway connecting Ahmadpur (now Birbhum district) and Katwa (now Purba Bardhaman district), West Bengal opened on 29 September 1917.

The engines chugged along at a maximum speed of 30 km per hour.

In 1966, ownership of the AKR, together with its sister line, the Burdwan–Katwa Railway, was transferred to the Eastern Railway zone of Indian Railways.

Gauge conversion

This 52 km-long railway section was converted to  broad gauge, work for which began on 14 January 2013. The line was opened to the public on 24 May 2018.

References

5 ft 6 in gauge railways in India
Rail transport in West Bengal
Transport in Birbhum district